KLV is key-length-value, a data encoding standard

KLV or variant, may also refer to:

 Maskelynes language (ISO 639 language code klv)
 Karlovy Vary Airport (IATA airport code KLV), Karlovy Vary, Bohemia, Czechia
 Kelve Road railway station (station code KLV), Kelve Road, Palghar, Konkan, Maharashtra, India; see List of railway stations in India
 Key leader vehicle; see List of the United States military vehicles by model number
 Kinderlandverschickung (KLV), the evacuations of children in Germany during World War II to the countryside
 Kolovratite (mineral code Klv), see List of mineral symbols
 KLV-TV (Karl-Lorimar Video), a home video brand
 KLV polynomial (Kazhdan–Lusztig–Vogan)

See also

 K. L. V. Vasantha (1923–2008), Indian actress
 KLVS (107.3 FM), Livermore, California, USA
 Las Vegas Municipal Airport (ICAO airport code: KLVS), Las Vegas, San Miguel County, New Mexico, USA
 KL5

 K55 (disambiguation)
 KIV (disambiguation)